The Hero Open was a professional golf tournament played on the European Tour. The event was created as part of the tour's overhaul in response to the COVID-19 pandemic in 2020. It was originally planned as a revival of the English Open, but after Hero MotoCorp agreed sponsorship of the event in July 2020, the event was effectively separated.

History
The inaugural tournament was held at Forest of Arden in Warwickshire, England. Sam Horsfield took the title, winning by one shot ahead of Thomas Detry. The event returned in 2021, when it was held at Fairmont St Andrews, in Fife, Scotland. Grant Forrest won by one shot ahead of James Morrison.

Winners

References

External links
Coverage on European Tour official site

Former European Tour events
Golf tournaments in the United Kingdom
Sport in Warwickshire
Sport in Fife
Recurring sporting events established in 2020